The Giftun Islands (also spelled Giftoun) are two islands in the Red Sea near Hurghada in Egypt. Giftun Kebir (جفتون الكبيرة) or Big Giftun is located further west and closer to Hurghada. Giftun Soraya (جفتون ثريا) or Little Giftun is further east.

References

Islands of Egypt
Islands of the Red Sea